The following is the list of squads for each of the 8 teams competing in the EuroBasket 1991, held in Italy between 24 and 29 June 1991. Each team selected a squad of 12 players for the tournament.

Group A

Bulgaria

Poland

Spain

Yugoslavia

Group B

Czechoslovakia

France

Greece

Italy

References
 1991 European Championship for Men, FIBA.com.
 European Championship 1991 - National Squads, LinguaSport.com.

1991